The Crane Hill Masonic Lodge is a historical Masonic building in Crane Hill, Alabama. Built in 1904, it is listed on the National Register of Historic Places.

Built as a meeting hall for "Crane Hill Masonic Lodge #554", it has also housed a school.

The building is a "free standing gable front" structure.  It was historically used as a meeting hall, as a school, as a multiple dwelling, and as a department store.

The building was listed on the Alabama Register of Landmarks and Heritage in February 1999.  It was listed on the National Register of Historic Places in 2001. It is currently used as a Masonic hall.

References

Former Masonic buildings in Alabama
Buildings and structures in Cullman County, Alabama
Masonic buildings completed in 1904
National Register of Historic Places in Cullman County, Alabama
Clubhouses on the National Register of Historic Places in Alabama